Dave Cummings (born David Charles Conners, March 13, 1940 – October 5, 2019) who billed himself the "oldest living male pornstar".

Life and education
Born in Saratoga Springs, New York, Cummings' background is unusual for a porn actor: he received both a Bachelor of Science degree in economics and a master's degree in public administration; in addition, he spent over 25 years as an officer in the United States Army, retiring with the rank of lieutenant colonel. He was married for 22 years and had two children and four grandchildren.

He was almost 55 years old before he launched his acting career with The Devil in Miss Jones 5: The Inferno and was regarded as a major adult porn star appearing in hundreds of adult films and a reputation for sexual stamina. Cummings claimed he only used viagra when doing back-to-back sex scenes or working with very demanding directors. He was inducted into the AVN Hall of Fame in 2007 and the XRCO Hall of Fame in 2011.

Death
Cummings died in his sleep on October 5, 2019, at age 79; he had been battling Alzheimer's disease in his latter years. Due to his record of armed service, Dave was laid to rest at Miramar National Cemetery in San Diego, California.

References

External links
 How To Be A Porn Star, Dave Cummings' essay
 VYUZ.com exclusive interview
 
 
 

1940 births
2019 deaths
American male pornographic film actors
People from Saratoga Springs, New York
Military personnel from New York (state)
United States Army colonels